Arturo de la Cruz Feliciani, better known for his stage name Cacho de la Cruz (Buenos Aires, 8 May 1937) is an Argentine-born television presenter, humorist and entertainer who developed almost all his career in Uruguay.

Son of Moroccan and Italian immigrants, he started working in Buenos Aires his teens. Soon he moved to Uruguay, where he has been working at Teledoce for decades. Some of his best-remembered TV programs are "El show del mediodía" and "Cacho Bochinche".

References

1937 births
Living people
People from Buenos Aires
Argentine people of Moroccan descent
Argentine people of Italian descent
Argentine people of Arab descent
Argentine male comedians
Argentine expatriates in Uruguay
Uruguayan television presenters
Uruguayan male comedians